Microbiota are the microflora and microfauna in an ecosystem.

Microbiota may also refer to:
Microbiota (plant), a genus of coniferous plants in the family Cupressaceae

See also
Gut microbiota
Human microbiota
Lung microbiota
Skin microbiota
Vaginal microbiota